The sixty-second Connecticut House of Representatives district elects one member of the Connecticut House of Representatives. Its current representative is Republican Mark Anderson. The district consists of the towns of Barkhamsted, Granby, Hartland, and New Hartford.

List of representatives

Recent elections

External links 
 Google Maps - Connecticut House Districts

References

62